The Parliament of Botswana consists of the President and the National Assembly. In contrast to other parliamentary systems, the Parliament elects the President directly (instead of having both a ceremonial President and a Prime Minister who has real authority as head of government) for a set five-year term of office. A president can only serve 2  full terms. The President is both Head of state and of government in Botswana's parliamentary republican system. Parliament of Botswana is the supreme legislative authority. The President of Botswana is Mokgweetsi Masisi, who assumed the Presidency on 1 April 2018 after winning the 2019 general election and returning his Botswana Democratic Party with a majority of 19 seats in the 65 seat National Assembly.

There also exists a body known as Ntlo ya Dikgosi, (The House of Chiefs), which is an advisory body that does not form part of the Parliament.

Botswana is one of only two nations on the African continent (with the other being Mauritius) to have achieved a clean record of free and fair elections since independence, having held 10 elections since 1966 without any serious incidents of corruption.

See also

Politics of Botswana
 National Assembly of Botswana
List of legislatures by country

References

External links
https://www.parliament.gov.bw/index.php/2012-02-13-15-06-33

Government of Botswana
Botswana
Botswana
Botswana